Hagan Enterprises (also known as Hagan Racing) was a NASCAR team that operated from 1969; 1975–1994. It was owned by owner/driver Billy Hagan. The team is best known for winning the 1984 NASCAR Winston Cup Series championship with Terry Labonte.

History

Hagan made three starts in NASCAR's Grand National/Winston Cup division, finishing eighth in his first start, the inaugural Talladega 500 in a self-owned 1968 Mercury Cyclone. He did not field another car until 1975, finishing 19th once again at Talladega. He also fielded a car for five races for Skip Manning.

In 1976, he fielded the #92 Stratagraph Chevrolet Chevelle Laguna for Manning, and he won Rookie of the Year honors. Manning was released in 1978, and replaced by Terry Labonte. Hagan hired Petty Enterprises crew chief Dale Inman for the 1984 season. Labonte won the Southern 500, and won the 1984 championship. Labonte left the team in 1986, and was replaced by Sterling Marlin. Labonte returned to the team in 1991, but was unable to continue their success. 1994, marked Hagan's last season as a single car owner, fielding cars for John Andretti and Randy MacDonald. In 1996, his shop was purchased by Triad Motorsports. Hagan continued to serve as a co-owner of the operation until the team's demise in 1999.

The team ran 547 races, won 6 races, had 101 top 5s, 236 top 10s, 372 top 20s, and 15 poles. They led 3,551 laps out of a possible 156,701, completing 85.83% of them. The drivers who drove for Hagan was Billy Hagan himself, Randy McDonald, Mel Larson, Joe Millikan, Dick May, John Andretti, Skip Manning, Sterling Marlin, and Terry Labonte. Labonte is the only driver who won a race for the team and won the 1984 Winston Cup Championship.

References

Defunct NASCAR teams